In Aztec mythology, Coyotlinahual or Coyotl Inahual (Nahuatl for "the coyote is his disguise") is the god of featherworkers (amanteca).

References 

Aztec gods
Crafts gods